Thomas Schiestl (born 31 August 2002) is an Austrian professional footballer who plays as a midfielder for 2. Liga club Liefering.

Career statistics

Club

Honours
FC Liefering

Runner-up
 Austrian Football First League: 2021

References

2002 births
Living people
Austrian footballers
Association football midfielders
FC Liefering players
2. Liga (Austria) players